Atalante may refer to:

Greece
 Atalante (island), an island in Central Greece
 Atalante (Attica), an island in Attica, Greece
 Atalante (Macedon), a town of ancient Macedon, Greece
  Atalante (Phthiotis), a town in Phthiotis, Greece
 Atalantē, sister of Macedonian general Perdiccas and wife of Attalus

Fiction
 Atlantes, a magician in Boiardo's Orlando Innamorato (1482)
 L'Atalante, a 1934 French film
 Númenor, a fictional island in J. R. R. Tolkien's legendarium, also called "Atalantë"
 Akallabêth, a short story by Tolkien about the Fall of Númenor, subtitled Atalantë

Other
 36 Atalante, an asteroid
 L'Atalante basin, a deep hypersaline anoxic basin in the Mediterranean sea.
 Atalante, a body style for the 1937 Bugatti Type 57 automobile
 French ironclad Atalante
 Atalante Quebec, a far-right group in Quebec

See also
 Atalanta (disambiguation)
 Atlante (disambiguation)